Sunqu Urqu (Quechua sunqu heart, urqu mountain, "heart mountain", Hispanicized spelling Soncco Orcco) is a mountain in the Arequipa Region in the Andes of Peru, about  high. It is situated in the La Unión Province, in the districts Alca and Tomepampa, and in the Condesuyos Province, Salamanca District, east of the mountains Saraqutu and Kuntur Sayana and west of the mountain Phirura (Firura).

References 

Mountains of Peru
Mountains of Arequipa Region